Akhund Mullah Shah Masjid or Akhoon Mullah Masjid or Dara Shikoh Masjid, known as Mala Shah Mashid in Kashmiri, is a mosque built by Dara Shikoh in 1649 for his spiritual mentor. Located in Srinagar, India, it is a mosque inside a mosque. The prime sanctuary is entirely separated from the main building through a courtyard that surrounds it. There is a stone lotus that crowns the podium of the mosque.

References 

Mosques in Jammu and Kashmir
Archaeological sites in Jammu and Kashmir
Buildings and structures in Srinagar
Mughal mosques